Annie Donna Fraser Tallent (1827–1901) was a pioneer, author, and educator in the Midwest in the late 19th century.

Biography 
Annie Fraser was born in York, New York to Donald G. and Margaret Ferguson Fraser and was educated at the Genesee Wesleyan Seminary in Lima, New York. She married lawyer David G. Tallent of Corning in 1854 and when gold was discovered in the Black Hills of South Dakota in 1874, the family left New York State for the frontier. Annie was the only woman in the Gordon Party, a gold-prospecting journey that covered over 400 miles from Sioux City, Iowa, to near Custer. She was the first white woman to enter the sacred grounds of the Lakota people on this expedition, which was undertaken in defiance of the U.S. Government's Laramie Treaty with the Sioux Nation. Tallent, like other pioneers, cited "manifest destiny", claiming that expansion into the area promoted economic growth and the advancement of civilization. She and her husband brought their young son, Robert, and settled in South Dakota after the Battle of the Little Bighorn. Mr. Tallent deserted his family during the 1880s, but Annie spent the rest of her life there, achieving success as a single mother, teacher, and superintendent of Pennington County schools.

In 1899, she authored the book The Black Hills; or, the Last Hunting Ground of the Dakotahs, a comprehensive history of the region. The book outlined her strong belief that "such treaties as tend to arrest the advance of civilization and retard the development of the rich resources of our country should not have been entered into." The book is controversial, but does present a history of the region during the last quarter of the 19th century. A granite monument to Annie Tallent commemorating her arrival stands on the banks of Stockade Lake near Custer.

References 

1827 births
1901 deaths
American pioneers
People from York, New York
People from Custer, South Dakota